Marin and Tomislav Draganja were the defending champions, but only Tomislav chose to defend his title, partnering Alessandro Giannessi. Tomislav Draganja lost in the quarterfinals to Andrej Martin and Hans Podlipnik Castillo.

Martin and Podlipnik Castillo won the title after defeating Laurynas Grigelis and Alessandro Motti 7–5, 4–6, [10–7] in the final.

Seeds

Draw

References
 Main Draw

Banja Luka Challenger - Doubles
2018 Doubles